Margate is a city in Broward County, Florida, United States. As of the 2020 census, the city had a population of 58,712. Margate is part of the Miami metropolitan area, which was home to 	6,166,488 people in 2020.

Margate was founded in the 1950s, when much of it was still either part of the Everglades or farmland. It became a town in 1955, when land development became prominent due to an influx of people moving to Margate. In 1961, it was officially incorporated as a city. The name Margate is a portmanteau of the first three letters of the founder's last name, Jack Marqusee, and the first four letters of gateway, since it was considered a "gateway" to western Broward County. The city has a waterpark called Calypso Cove and two golf courses: The Carolina Golf Club and the Oriole Golf and Tennis Club.

Geography

Demographics

2020 census

As of the 2020 United States census, there were 58,712 people, 23,306 households, and 13,610 families residing in the city.

2010 census

As of 2010, there were 24,863 households, with 13.6% being vacant. In 2000, there were 22,714 households, out of which 25.8% had children under the age of 18 living with them, 49.1% were married couples living together, 10.2% had a female householder with no husband present, and 36.9% were non-families. 30.8% of all households were made up of individuals, and 18.0% had someone living alone who was 65 years of age or older. The average household size was 2.36 and the average family size was 2.95.

2000 census

In 2000, the city the population was spread out, with 20.9% under the age of 18, 6.5% from 18 to 24, 29.2% from 25 to 44, 21.7% from 45 to 64, and 21.7% who were 65 years of age or older. The median age was 40 years. For every 100 females, there were 89.5 males. For every 100 females age 18 and over, there were 85.6 males.

In 2000, the median income for a household in the city was $38,722, and the median income for a family was $48,254. Males had a median income of $35,630 versus $26,624 for females. The per capita income for the city was $20,308. About 5.5% of families and 8.4% of the population were below the poverty line, including 10.7% of those under age 18 and 10.4% of those age 65 or over.

As of 2000, 75.9% of residents speak English as their first language, 13.8% speak Spanish, 2.85% French Creole, 1.69% French, and 1.20% Italian.

As of 2000, Margate was the sixty-sixth most Colombian-populated area in the US at 2.22% of residents. It was also the forty-ninth most Haitian-populated area (tied with Pleasantville, New Jersey) at 3.2% and forty-third most Jamaican-populated area (tied with Opa-locka) at 3% of the population.

Education

Margate is served by public schools operated by Broward County Public Schools.
               
Elementary schools
Atlantic West Elementary (STEAM Magnet School) – Central, west, and southwest Margate
Liberty Elementary (STEM Magnet School) – Portions east of US 441
Margate Elementary – Central, north, and northwest Margate
Morrow Elementary (in North Lauderdale) – Southwest Margate

Middle school
Margate Middle School (STEM Magnet School) – Serves almost all of the city
Silver Lakes Middle School (in North Lauderdale) – serves a small section of the city
Rise Academy – Small School located on the border of Margate.

High schools
Coconut Creek High School (in neighboring Coconut Creek)
Coral Springs High School (in neighboring Coral Springs)
Monarch High School (in Coconut Creek)

It is also in proximity to, and in the service area of, the all-magnet school Atlantic Technical High School (in neighboring Coconut Creek).

Charter Schools
Broward Math and Science Schools (K–8)
RISE Academy (K–8)
West Broward Academy (K–8)

Charter High Schools
Ascend Academy (9–12)
SunEd High School of North Broward (9–12)

Private schools
Abundant Life Christian Academy
Faith Baptist Academy
Hebrew Academy Community School
Winfield Christian Academy

Notable people

 Shayne Gostisbehere, a professional hockey player for Philadelphia Flyers
 Brandon Knight, who played basketball as a child in Margate's recreation league at Firefighter's Park and last played with the NBA Dallas Mavericks. 
 Michael Palardy, a punter for NFL's New England Patriots.
 Josh Smith, a Margate native and Abundant Life Christian Academy student who made his Major League Baseball debut on June 23, 2015, for the Cincinnati Reds, pitching a series opener against the Pittsburgh Pirates. He returned to the MLB on May 3, 2017, as a relief pitcher for the Oakland Athletics. He began playing with the Boston Red Sox organization as of 2019.
 Kaye Stevens, a singer and actress who lived in Margate for more than 45 years (from 1950s to 2004). Many residents referred to Stevens as the "First Lady of Margate", because every time she appeared on game shows, she would place a sign next to her nameplate that read "Hello Margate". She promoted Margate as "a great place to live and raise a family."

References

External links

 City of Margate official website
 MargateNews.net Independent news media. 
Margate Talk Independent news

Cities in Broward County, Florida
Cities in Florida
1955 establishments in Florida
Populated places established in 1955